Events in the year 930 in Japan.

Events

Births

Incumbents
Monarch: Daigo then Suzaku

Deaths
October 30 – Emperor Daigo (born 885)

References

930
10th century in Japan